William Barron Norton (28 April 1862 – 17 December 1898) was a Welsh international rugby union three-quarter who played club rugby for Cardiff Rugby Football Club and international rugby for Wales. He was awarded six caps for Wales.

Rugby career 
Norton was one of the earliest Welsh internationals and first represented his country in 1882, in the team's first ever encounter with Ireland. Captained by Charles Lewis, Norton entered a team containing ten new caps, after the Welsh team were humiliated in their inaugural game against England. Wales won the game making it the very first international victory for the team. Norton was reselected for the next five matches, completing the entirety of the 1883 and 1884 Home Nations Championships. Wales lost both games of the 1883 Championship, and the opening two games of the 1884 tournament, but were successful for the final game of the series against Ireland. The 1884 Irish game saw the Ireland team arrive two players short and were forced to borrow two Welsh players to complete their team. Although the last game of Norton's international career, he ended by scoring his only try for his country.

International matches played
Wales
  1882, 1884
  1882, 1884
  1883, 1884

Bibliography

References 

Welsh rugby union players
Rugby union forwards
1862 births
1898 deaths
Cardiff RFC players
Rugby union players from Carmarthen
Wales international rugby union players
People educated at Queen Elizabeth High School, Carmarthen